Katarina Radivojević (Serbian Cyrillic: Катарина Радивојевић; born 29 March 1979) is a Serbian actress. She is known for her roles in films such as Zona Zamfirova and Tears for Sale.

Personal life 
Radivojević was born in Belgrade. She is good friends with actress Marija Vicković and singer Ana Stanić.

Filmography

Film

Television

Theater 
In 2009 Katarina Radivojevic had her New York City debut. She was the lead in Off Broadway show Painkillers, directed by Serbian-American director Sanja Beštić in Theatre Row in Times Square.

References

External links 

 

1979 births
Living people
Actresses from Belgrade
Serbian film actresses
Serbian stage actresses
Serbian television actresses
20th-century Serbian actresses
21st-century Serbian actresses